Alexander Ushakov may refer to:

Alexander Ushakov (biathlete) (born 1948), former Soviet biathlete
Alexander Ushakov (bobsledder) (born 1979), Russian bobsledder